Moon Germs is a jazz album by Joe Farrell, recorded at the Van Gelder Studio on November 21, 1972 and released on CTI Records.

Track listing
"Great Gorge" (Joe Farrell) – 11:48
"Moon Germs" (Farrell) – 7:27
"Time's Lie" (Chick Corea) – 8:32
"Bass Folk Song" (Stanley Clarke) – 9:47

Personnel
Joe Farrell – soprano saxophone, flute
Herbie Hancock – electric piano
Stanley Clarke – bass
Jack DeJohnette – drums

Recording credits
Engineer – Rudy Van Gelder
Cover photograph – Pete Turner
Liner photograph – Sheila Metzner
Album design – Bob Ciano

Chart performance

References

External links

1973 albums
Joe Farrell albums
Herbie Hancock albums
Stanley Clarke albums
Jack DeJohnette albums
Albums produced by Creed Taylor
Albums recorded at Van Gelder Studio